An Australian by Marriage is a 1923 Australian dramatized documentary directed by Raymond Longford. It was commissioned by the Australian government for the British Empire Exhibition in Wembley Park, London, in 1924, to serve as propaganda for attracting migrants to Australia.

Plot
Isabelle (Lottie Lyell) emigrates from England to Australia after getting engaged to an Australian carpenter. Isabelle is met by the Y.W.C.A. on arrival and secures a position as a nursemaid. She and herfiancébuild a home. They obtain a baby bonus.

Cast
Lottie Lyell as Isabelle

Reception
According to one review, "the picture is well produced and acted in a bright manner, and should, indeed, be a great incentive for young people to migrate to the Commonwealth."

References

1923 films
Australian silent films
Australian black-and-white films
Australian documentary films
1923 documentary films
British Empire Exhibition
World's fair films